A dreidel, also dreidle or dreidl (plural: dreydlech) is a four-sided spinning top, played during the Jewish holiday of Hanukkah. The dreidel is a Jewish variant on the teetotum, a gambling toy found in many European cultures.

Each side of the dreidel bears a letter of the Hebrew alphabet:
 (nun),
 (gimel),
 (hei),
 (shin).
However, according to folk etymology, they represent the Hebrew phrase  (nes gadól hayá sham, "a great miracle happened there"), referring to the miracle of the cruse of oil. For this reason, most dreidels in Israel replace the letter shin with a letter 
 (pe), to represent the phrase  (nes gadól hayá po, "a great miracle happened here"); however, many Haredi communities insist that the letter shin should be used in the Holy Land as well, because the reference to "there" means in the Holy Temple and not in the Land.

While not mandated (a mitzvah) for Hanukkah (the only traditional  are lighting candles and saying the full hallel), spinning the dreidel is a traditional game played during the holiday.

Astronaut Jeffrey A. Hoffman spun a dreidel made by Israeli silversmith Gideon Hay for an hour in outer space.

Origins

The teetotum was inscribed with letters denoting the Latin words for "nothing", "everything", "half", and "put in". The letters served as a means to recalling the rules of the game.

This theory states that when the game spread to Jewish communities unfamiliar with Yiddish, the denotations of the Hebrew letters were not understood. As a result, there arose Jewish traditions to explain their assumed meaning. However, in Judaism there are often multiple explanations developed for words. A popular conjecture had it that the letters abbreviated the words  (nes gadól hayá sham, "a great miracle happened there"), an idea that became attached to dreidels when the game entered into Hanukkah festivities.

According to a tradition first documented in 1890, the game was developed by Jews who illegally studied the Torah in seclusion as they hid, sometimes in caves, from the Seleucids under Antiochus IV. At the first sign of Seleucids approaching, their Torah scrolls would be concealed and be replaced by dreidels. In the wake of Zionism, the dreidel was renamed  in modern Israel and the letters were altered, with shin generally replaced by pe. This yields the reading  (nes gadól hayá po, "a great miracle happened here").

Etymology

The Hebrew word  comes from the Semitic root  ("to turn") and was invented by Itamar Ben-Avi (the son of Eliezer Ben-Yehuda) when he was five years old. Hayyim Nahman Bialik used a different word, kirkar (from the root  – "to spin"), in his poems, but it was not adopted into spoken Hebrew.

In the lexicon of Ashkenazi Jews from Udmurtia and Tatarstan the local historian A. V. Altyntsev utilised several other appellations of a dreidel, such as volchok, khanuke-volchok, fargl, varfl, dzihe and zabavke.

Symbolism
Some rabbis ascribe symbolic significance to the markings on the dreidel. One commentary, for example, connects the four letters with the four nations to which the House of Judah was historically subject—Babylonia, Persia, the Seleucid Empire and Rome. A gematria reading yields the number 358, identical to the value of the four letters used to spell "Moshiach" (Messiah).

Rules of the game

Each player begins with an equal number of game pieces (usually 10–15). The game pieces can be any object, such as chocolate gelt, pennies, raisins, etc.
To start the game, every participant puts one game piece into the center "pot". Every player also puts one piece into the pot when the pot is empty or there is only one game piece in the pot.
Each player spins the dreidel once during their turn. Depending on which side is facing up when it stops spinning, the player whose turn it is gives or takes game pieces from the pot:
If  (nun) is facing up, the player does nothing.
If  (gimel) is facing up, the player gets everything in the pot.
If  (hei) is facing up, the player gets half of the pieces in the pot. If there are an odd number of pieces in the pot, the player takes half the pot rounded up to the nearest whole number.
In some game versions a shin results in adding three game pieces to the pot, one for each stem of the letter shin.
If the player is out of pieces, they are either "out" or may ask another player for a "loan".

Similarly, the Hebrew letters on a dreidel may be taken as a mnemonic for the game rules in Yiddish. Occasionally, in the United States, the Hebrew letters on the dreidel form an English-language mnemonic about the rules: hei or "H" for "half"; gimel or "G" for "get all"; nun or "N" for "nothing"; and shin or "S" for "share".

Analysis
Thomas Robinson and Sujith Vijay have shown that the expected number of spins in a game of dreidel is O(n2), where n is the number of game pieces each player begins with. The implied constant depends on the number of players.

Robert Feinerman has shown that the game of dreidel is unfair, in that the first player to spin has a better expected outcome than the second player, and the second better than the third, and so on.

Collections

Childhood enjoyment of dreidels has led to a growing interest in collecting them in adulthood. Jewish institutions such as the Spertus Institute for Jewish Learning and Leadership, Yeshiva University Museum and Temple Emanu-El in New York, house dreidel collections, as do museums such as the Spinning Top and Yo-Yo Museum in Burlington, Wisconsin.

Antique dreidels are of increasing value and interest: different styles of dreidels are to be found across the world. Exemplars include dreidels fashioned in wood, silver, brass and lead. One particularly rare dreidel is cast from an ivory original by Moshe Murro from the Bezalel Academy in Jerusalem in 1929. Rare collectible dreidels from Cochin are made from iron; they are black in colour decorated with silver markings, made by an intricate Bidriware style process.

The Guinness World Record for Most Valuable Dreidel was achieved by Estate Diamond Jewelry in November 2019 and was valued at $70,000. The design of Estate Diamond Jewelry's dreidel was inspired by the Chrysler Building in New York. Previous holders of the title were Chabad of South Palm Beach with a dreidel valued at $14,000.

Tournaments
Dreidel is now a spoof competitive sport in North America. Major League Dreidel (MLD), founded in New York City in 2007, hosts dreidel tournaments during the holiday of Hanukkah. In MLD tournaments the player with the longest time of spin (TOS) is the winner. MLD is played on a Spinagogue, the official spinning stadium of Major League Dreidel. Pamskee was the 2007 MLD Champion. Virtual Dreidel was the 2008 MLD Champion. In 2009, Major League Dreidel launched a game version of the Spinagogue.

In 2009, Good Morning America published a story on Dreidel Renaissance reporting on the rising popularity of the dreidel. Dreidel games that have come out on the market since 2007 include No Limit Texas Dreidel, a cross between traditional dreidel and Texas Hold'em poker, invented by a Judaica company called ModernTribe. Other new dreidel games include Staccabees and Maccabees.

See also
 I Have a Little Dreidel (The Dreidel Song)
 Hanukkah music
 Hanukkah gelt
 Jewish ceremonial art

Notes

References

External links

Dreidel Wizard
The Origin of the Dreidel
Computer program that plays the dreidel game (with full Java source code)
Dreidel Design 
Types of Dreidels 
A Dreidel collection (part of world's largest collection of dice)

Gambling games
Hanukkah traditions
Israeli games
Israeli inventions
Tops
Traditional toys
Wooden toys
Yiddish words and phrases

he:סביבון#סביבון חנוכה